Capulin Volcano National Monument is a U.S. National Monument located in northeastern New Mexico that protects and interprets an extinct cinder cone volcano and is part of the Raton-Clayton volcanic field. A paved road spirals gradually around the volcano and visitors can drive up to a parking lot at the rim of the extinct volcano. Hiking trails circle the rim as well as lead down into the mouth of the volcano. The monument was designated on August 9, 1916, and is administered by the National Park Service.

The visitor center features exhibits about the volcano and the area's geology, natural and cultural history, and offers educational programs about volcanoes.  There is also a video presentation about the volcano.  The name capulin comes from a type of choke cherry, Prunus virginiana, that is native to southern North America.

Apollo 16's John Young and Charlie Duke did some of their geologic training here in May 1971. William R. Muehlberger was one of the geology instructors.

Description
From the National Park Service:

Visitor activities 

The two mile road that winds from the bottom of the volcano all the way to the top is popular with visitors.  Once the top is reached, views of the surrounding volcano field, Sangre De Cristo mountains, the flora and fauna are visible.  From late June to early August a phenomenon called hilltopping can be seen on the Crater Rim trail, thousands upon thousands of ladybugs cover trees and bushes at the top of the volcano. Capulin is also International Dark-Sky Association Gold Tier Certified, which means it has one of the darkest night skies in the entire country. Due to low levels of light pollution incredible views of the Milky Way and constellations are evident.

Visitors can hike a variety of different trails located throughout the park. The Lava Flow trail is a mile long loop that runs along the southern portion of the park.  The Boca Trail is a 1.7 mile long loop that runs along the western base of the volcano, hikers can view the collapsed lava tubes that were created thousands of years ago at the foundation of the volcano.  There are two different trails accessible from the top of the volcano: the Crater Rim trail which is a one-mile loop that goes around the entirety of the rim of the volcano and the Crater Vent trail which goes 200 yards into the crater itself.

History 
According to the National Park Service, on January 16, 1891, Capulin Mountain was

...withdrawn from settlement, entry or other disposition under any of the public land laws, until such time as Congress may see fit to take action touching the same or until otherwise ordered by competent authority...

On August 9, 1916, President Woodrow Wilson set Capulin aside as a U.S. National Monument by Presidential Proclamation No. 1340, to preserve "...a striking example of recent extinct volcanoes ... which ...is of great scientific and especially geologic interest..."

Jessie Foote Jack and other local ranchers highly valued Capulin Volcano during this time period as it was considered prime grazing land. In order to ensure sole rights to graze cattle on the volcano, Jessie used her husband's political connections to secure the position of custodian for the monument. Serving from 1916 to 1921, Jessie Foote Jack was the first custodian for Capulin Volcano, as well as the first female custodian in the National Park Service.

In 1921, Homer Farr would unofficially become the custodian of the monument at the request of Mrs. Jack. Later, in 1923, Farr would officially take over the position serving the National Park Service until 1955. His enthusiasm for the volcano brought numerous changes to the monument. During his tenure, Farr was credited with building the monument's infrastructure which includes the road to the rim, procuring funding in economically difficult times, and garnering a Civil Works Project during the Great Depression to stabilize the road and build retaining walls.

Public Law 87-635, 87th Congress, S.2973, September 5, 1962, amended the proclamation to "...preserve the scenic and scientific integrity of Capulin Mountain National Monument..." because of the significance of Capulin Volcano.

On December 31, 1987, Congress changed the Monument's name from Capulin Mountain National Monument to Capulin Volcano National Monument by Public Law 100-225 (101 Stat. 1547).

Ecology 

Although Capulin is primarily known for its volcanic geology, the park boasts a rich diversity of plant and animal life. The grasslands of the Great Plains and the forests of the Rocky Mountains combine at Capulin to form a unique ecotone which provides habitat for 73 species of birds in addition to numerous other animals.  Songbirds such as the spotted towhee, Bullock's oriole, mountain bluebird, and Steller's jay all call Capulin Volcano home.  Larger birds such as the wild turkey, osprey, red-tailed hawk, as well as New Mexico's state bird, the roadrunner, also live within the park. There are five different species of hummingbird that migrate through Capulin during the summer months.

Some of the larger mammals that frequent the park include the American black bear, cougar, pronghorn, elk, and the most numerous of larger mammals, the mule deer. Smaller mammals such as the American badger, Mexican free-tailed bat, ring-tailed cat, desert cottontail, and North American porcupine also inhabit Capulin Volcano National Monument.  The unique landscape and flora create a habitat that allows a large and diverse group of animals to co-exist in a relatively small area. The abundance of diversity is not contained to just warm blooded animals however, Capulin also has a large group of cold blooded reptiles as well. The prairie rattlesnake and bullsnake are seen throughout the park. Western fence lizards and horned lizards can be seen on hiking trails. The tiger salamander is found in pools of water that sometimes collect around the park.

Solidago capulinensis, known as the Capulin goldenrod, is a rare plant endemic to Capulin Volcano National Monument. It is the only known rare vascular plant species in the monument.

See also 
 List of national monuments of the United States
 Black Mesa (Oklahoma) to the northeast
 Eastern New Mexico
 Johnson Mesa to the northwest
 Sierra Grande to the southeast

References

External links 

 Official Capulin Volcano National Monument website—National Park Service
 Sangres.com: Information and photos
 Geology Fieldnotes: Capulin Volcano National Monument—National Park Service

Cinder cones of the United States
Extinct volcanoes
Geology museums in New Mexico
Mountains of New Mexico
Museums in Union County, New Mexico
National Park Service National Monuments in New Mexico
Natural history museums in New Mexico
Pleistocene volcanism
Protected areas established in 1916
Protected areas of Union County, New Mexico
Volcanoes of New Mexico
Landforms of Union County, New Mexico
Mountains of Union County, New Mexico